Murugesu Balasundaram (7 April 1903 – 15 December 1965) was a Ceylon Tamil lawyer, politician and Member of Parliament.

Early life and family
Balasundaram was born on 7 April 1903. He was the son of Reverend K. S. Murugesu, a Methodist clergyman. He was educated at Kilner College, Jaffna and Royal College, Colombo. After school Balasundaram joined the Ceylon University College, graduating in 1923 with a B.Sc. degree. He received a scholarship to study at Trinity Hall, Cambridge from where he graduated with a B.A. degree.

Balasundaram married Sinnammah, daughter of Sinnathamby. They had four sons (Gnanasanmugan, Yogasundaram, Balakrishnan and Sivanandasundaram) and two daughters (Somasundaravalli and Yogeswari).

Career
After returning to Ceylon Balasundaram worked as journalist for a brief period before joining the legal profession as an advocate.

Balasundaram was one of the founding members of the Jaffna Youth Congress in 1924. He stood as the Illankai Tamil Arasu Kachchi's (Federal Party) candidate in Kopay at the March 1960 parliamentary election. He won the election and entered Parliament. He was re-elected at the July 1960 parliamentary election. He stood as an independent candidate in Kopay at 1965 parliamentary election but was defeated by the ITAK candidate S. Kathiravelupillai.

Balasundaram died on 15 December 1965.

References

1903 births
1965 deaths
Alumni of the Ceylon University College
Alumni of Royal College, Colombo
Alumni of Trinity Hall, Cambridge
Ceylonese advocates
Illankai Tamil Arasu Kachchi politicians
Members of the 4th Parliament of Ceylon
Members of the 5th Parliament of Ceylon
People from Northern Province, Sri Lanka
People from British Ceylon
Sri Lankan Tamil journalists
Sri Lankan Tamil lawyers
Sri Lankan Tamil politicians